Scalar may refer to:

Scalar (mathematics), an element of a field, which is used to define a vector space, usually the field of real numbers
Scalar (physics), a physical quantity that can be described by a single element of a number field such as a real number
Lorentz scalar, a quantity in the theory of relativity which is invariant under a Lorentz transformation
Pseudoscalar,  a quantity that behaves like a scalar, except that it changes sign under a parity inversion
Scalar (computing), any non-composite value
Scalar boson, in physics, a boson subatomic particle whose spin equals zero

See also
dot product, also known as scalar product
dimensionless quantity, also known as scalar quantity
Inner product space
Scalar field
Scale (music)
Scaler (disambiguation)
Pterophyllum scalare (Lichtenstein, 1823), a species of freshwater angelfish
 Scala (disambiguation)